Laura: Live at the Bottom Line is the second live album by New York City-born singer, songwriter, and pianist Laura Nyro and her tenth original album in total, including the 1977 live album Season of Lights.

Nyro's long-time label Columbia Records wanted a brand new studio album from Nyro, who had stayed with the label despite not having had a reasonable commercial success for well over a decade. Instead, she decided she wanted to go on the road and record a new live album.

Columbia did not approve, and a deal was negotiated allowing Nyro to release the live album on a different label, Cypress, before returning to Columbia for another studio album.

Live at the Bottom Line was recorded at New York's famous intimate venue, The Bottom Line, and mixes some of Nyro's famous compositions with newer ones and also previously unreleased songs.

Track listing
All tracks composed by Laura Nyro; except where indicated

The song "Broken Rainbow" had been written and recorded for an Oscar-nominated documentary of the same name in 1985, and was included in re-recorded form on 1993's Walk the Dog and Light the Light.

The final song is a medley.

Personnel
Laura Nyro - voice, keyboards
Jimmy Vivino - guitar, mandolin, co-producer
David Wofford - bass
Frank Pagano - drums
Nydia "Liberty" Mata - percussion
Diane Wilson, Frank Pagano, Jimmy Vivino - harmony vocals

References
 Allmusic
 Laura Nyro
 Michele Kort's biography Soul Picnic: The Music and Passion of Laura Nyro

Laura Nyro live albums
1989 live albums
Albums recorded at the Bottom Line